Taichu may refer to:
 Taichung, Taiwan, known as Taichū in Japanese
 Taichū Prefecture, former name of Taichung

Historical eras
Taichu (104BC–101BC), an era name used by Emperor Wu of Han
Taichu (386–394), an era name used by Fu Deng, emperor of Former Qin
Taichu (388–400), an era name used by Qifu Gangui, ruler of Western Qin
Taichu (397–399), an era name used by Tufa Wugu, ruler of Southern Liang
Taichu (453), an era name used by Liu Shao (Liu Song), emperor of Liu Song